Reputation (stylized in all lowercase) is the sixth studio album by American singer-songwriter Taylor Swift. It was released on November 10, 2017, and was her last album under Big Machine Records. Swift conceived the album during her self-seclusion from public appearances as an effect of the rampant tabloid scrutiny on her private life and celebrity after her fifth studio album, 1989 (2014).

Inspired by the fantasy series Game of Thrones, Swift bisected the album's lyrical scope: one dealing with the downsides of fame and the resultant anger, and the other is about love amidst the tumult. She worked with two production teams, one with Jack Antonoff and the other with Max Martin and Shellback. Reputation is primarily an electropop and R&B record with a heavy electronic production consisting of programmed drum machines, pulsating synthesizers, manipulated vocals, and influences of urban genres like hip hop, EDM, and trap.

Swift opted out of press interviews to promote the album, which she had done for previous releases. She cleared out her website and social media accounts, which generated wide internet attention and has since influenced other artists' promotional campaigns. Reputation was preceded by two international top-ten singles, "Look What You Made Me Do" and "...Ready for It?", the former of which topped charts, including the US Billboard Hot 100, and broke sales and streaming records. The final international single, "Delicate", peaked atop US Billboard airplay charts. Critics received the album with generally positive reviews; some deemed the theme and sound as harsh, but most praised Swift's songwriting for depicting intimacy and vulnerability. Retrospective reviews have described Reputation as an album of experimentation and emotional evolution for Swift.

The album was Swift's fifth consecutive to debut atop the US Billboard 200 with first-week sales of over one million copies; it spent four weeks atop the chart. Reputation also topped charts in countries including Australia, Canada, and the UK. It was the best-selling album by a female artist of 2017, selling over 4.5 million copies. Swift in support of the album embarked on the Reputation Stadium Tour (2018), which became the highest-grossing North American tour of all time. Reputation was nominated for Best Pop Vocal Album at the 61st Annual Grammy Awards, and was listed on Slant Magazine list of the best albums of the 2010s decade.

Background 

American singer-songwriter Taylor Swift, who had identified as a country musician, released her fifth studio album, 1989, in October 2014. With 1989's synth-pop production, Swift departed from the country-music scene to embrace mainstream pop. The album received generally positive reviews and transformed Swift's status to that of a pop icon. It sold 10 million copies worldwide and its accompanying world tour was the highest-grossing of 2015. The album's singles, including three US Billboard Hot 100 chart toppers, dominated US airplay for over a year and a half, which Billboard described as "a kind of cultural omnipresence that's rare for a 2010s album".

Swift's rising popularity with 1989 turned her into a fixation onto which the media imposed questions regarding cultural issues of race, gender, and politics. Her "girl squad" of female celebrity friends including fashion models, actresses, and singers, received backlash for allegedly promoting a false idea of feminism which The Daily Telegraph remarked as "impossibly beautiful women flaunting impossibly perfect lives". Tabloid media publicized her short-lived romantic relationships with Scottish producer Calvin Harris and English actor Tom Hiddleston, and a feud with rapper Kanye West and media personality Kim Kardashian over West's song "Famous", in which he claims he made Swift a success (the lyric "I made that bitch famous" was particularly controversial). Although Swift said she never consented to the said lyric, Kardashian released a phone recording between Swift and West, in which the former seemingly consented to another portion of the song.

After the West–Kardashian controversy, critics regarded Swift as fake and calculating, a conclusion that surmounted after years of what they saw as a deliberate maneuver to carefully cultivate her public image. Her once-reputation as "America's Sweetheart", attributed to her down-to-earth and positive image, began to fade. The tumultuous events made her a subject of an online "#IsOverParty" hashtag, where her detractors denounced her as a "snake". They overshadowed her public advocacy; the praise she received for her victory in a sexual assault trial, part of an ongoing public debate about sexual misconduct, had minimal impact in improving her image. Swift became increasingly reticent on social media despite a large following, and avoided the press amidst the commotion. She announced a prolonged hiatus and felt "people might need a break from [her]".

Recording and conception 

During seclusion from public appearances, Swift wrote Reputation as a "defense mechanism" against the rampant media scrutiny targeting her, and as a means to revamp her state of mind. She said in a 2019 Rolling Stone interview that she followed the songwriting for her 2014 single "Blank Space", which satirizes the criticism targeting her for dating "too many people" in her twenties, and wrote Reputation from the perspective of a character that others believed her to be. Although the media gossip was a major inspiration, recurring romantic themes of love and friendship that had been dominant in Swift's songwriting remained intact. She recalled that amidst the "battle raging on" outside, she found solace in quiet moments with her loved ones and began creating a newfound private life on her own terms "for the first time" since starting her career.

Swift worked on Reputation with two production teams: one with Jack Antonoff, and the other with Max Martin and Shellback; she had worked with all three on 1989. By engaging a smaller production group on Reputation than on 1989, she envisioned that the album would be more coherent but still "versatile enough". She executive produced Reputation and co-wrote all of its 15 tracks. Martin and Shellback co-wrote and produced nine, and Antonoff co-wrote and co-produced the remaining six, all of which were co-produced by Swift. Three musicians co-wrote and co-produced select tracks with Martin and Shellback, including Ali Payami ("...Ready for It?"), Oscar Görres ("So It Goes..."), and Oscar Holter ("Dancing with Our Hands Tied"). The track "End Game" features songwriting credits and guest appearances from English singer-songwriter Ed Sheeran and American rapper Future.

Recording sessions with Antonoff mostly took place at his home studio in Brooklyn, with several trips to Atlanta and California for him to incorporate ideas from other producers. He wanted Swift to capture her emotions at a particular time when "you can feel like you can conquer the world, or you can feel like the biggest piece of garbage that ever existed", resulting in a "very intense" record. As Swift wanted to record the album in secrecy, Antonoff kept his studio computer offline to prevent a possible internet leak, and deleted the trials once the mixing and mastering finalized.

Musical styles 
Reputation is primarily an electropop album. It incorporates a heavy, maximalist electronic production with EDM instrumentation and rhythms. The melodies are characterized by underlying bass notes, pulsating synthesizers, and loud, intense programmed drum machines. Pitchfork critic Jamieson Cox described the instrumentation as "hair-raising bass drops, vacuum-cleaner synths [...], stuttering trap percussion, cyborg backing choirs". Swift's voice is heavily manipulated, either distorted or multitracked. Critics found Reputation sonically heavier, louder, and darker than its predecessor 1989's bright synth-pop, with Neil McCormick from The Daily Telegraph deeming it "a big, brash, all-guns-blazing blast of weaponised pop". Swift associated Reputation's sound with imagery of "nighttime cityscape ... old warehouse buildings that had been deserted and factory spaces".

The album's first half, made up of mostly tracks produced by Martin and Shellback, is comparatively heavier in sound. The first four tracks—"...Ready for It?", "End Game", "I Did Something Bad", "Don't Blame Me"—are particularly aggressive. "...Ready for It?" has an industrial production backed by a thumping bassline, "End Game" features sputtering trap beats, "I Did Something Bad" is punctuated by a dubstep drop, and "Don't Blame Me" has a gothic, gospel-oriented soundscape drenched in synthesizers, dubstep beats, and vocal harmonization. "Look What You Made Me Do" uses modular synthesizers, drums, and guitars in the second pre-chorus; it incorporates an interpolation of "I'm Too Sexy" (1991) by English band Right Said Fred. The power ballad "So It Goes..." has an atmospheric trap-pop production. "King of My Heart" features surging keyboard instruments in the pre-chorus and thumping drums in the post-chorus, and "Dancing with Our Hands Tied" is instrumented with propelling beats and an EDM refrain.

The second half, mostly driven by Antonoff's 1980s-synth-pop production characterized by pulsing synthesizers and upbeat refrains, brings forth a somewhat softer, more emotional sound. Jon Caramanica of The New York Times described the change of tone; "in the beginning, [Swift] is indignant and barbed, but by the end she's practically cooing." "Dress" features a sultry production with stuttering beats, syncopated phrasings, swirling synthesizers, and a refrain containing falsetto vocals. "Getaway Car" and "Call It What You Want" are two atmospheric synth-pop tracks. The latter, produced with an Akai MPC and strings simulated by a Yamaha DX7 synthesizer, incorporates a subdued, trap-R&B production. The closing track, the piano ballad "New Year's Day", is the album's only acoustic song; it was recorded on an acoustic piano in "scratch takes" that do not filter unwanted sounds from the outer environment.

Influences of many urban genres, most prominently hip hop, trap, and R&B, and other subgenres including grime, tropical house, and Miami bass, are visible throughout. Kitty Empire of The Observer categorized Reputation as an R&B record. According to Caramanica, its sound is "soft-core pop-R&B" and the musical influences are rooted in black music but Swift "[softens] them enough to where [she] can credibly attempt them". Specifically, the drum patterns embrace trap influences and push Swift's vocals toward hip-hop-and-R&B-oriented cadences and delivery. For instance, "End Game" features Swift singing with loose, near-rap cadences; Cox found this influence to strip her vocals off their expressiveness and give them a conversational quality. Other urban influences are on such tracks as "Delicate", which incorporate a Caribbean-inflected sound and tropical house beats; "Gorgeous", which features hip-hop-trademark 808 drums and rhythms; and "Dress", an R&B slow jam. On tracks such as "Delicate", "Getaway Car", "King of My Heart", her vocals are processed with a vocoder, which NPR critic Ann Powers attributed to the influence of rappers and R&B artists.

Themes and lyrics 
Swift said that Reputation's tracks have a linear timeline, beginning with how she felt when she started working on the album, and transitioning to how she felt by the time it was completed. Inspired by the fantasy series Game of Thrones, she split the album into two sides; one contains songs about vengeance and drama with a heavier production, and the other about finding love, friendship, and "something sacred throughout all the battle cries". The series' characters and little hints to foreshadow the story lines, which Swift considered "cryptic", prompted her to finesse her songwriting and include "cryptic" messages through which she hoped to communicate with fans. She identified Game of Thrones influences for certain songs; "I Did Something Bad" was inspired by Sansa and Arya Stark's plot to kill Littlefinger, "Look What You Made Me Do" by Arya Stark's "kill list", and "King of My Heart" by Daenerys Targaryen and Khal Drogo's romance.

Critic Steven Hyden considered Reputation a concept album about Swift's celebrity and said it encapsulates her attention to the conversation about her. It references alcohol and sex more than any of Swift's previous records; for instance, alcohol is mentioned on such tracks as "Gorgeous" ("whisky on ice"), "Getaway Car" ("Old Fashioned"), "Dress" ("bathtub wine"), and "This Is Why We Can't Have Nice Things" ("champagne sea"). The New York Times' Lindsay Zoladz considered this Swift's gradual, deliberate decision at 27 years old to abandon her previous youthful and innocent music and image, unlike former teenage female singers who provocatively publicize their sudden "loss of innocence". Despite the first few tracks about outright vengeance and anger, much of Reputation is about romantic themes of finding love, intimacy, and expressing one's vulnerability when one thinks they might have suffered too much to love again. For critic Rob Sheffield, the album is a song cycle about how one stops chasing romance and defining their life based on others' perspectives. Some critics interpreted the overarching narrative as a love story chronicling the burgeoning days, fallout, and recovery, which Swift corroborated in a 2019 Rolling Stone interview: "The one-two punch, bait-and-switch of Reputation is that it was actually [...] a love story in amongst chaos."

Swift's image as a woman with serial romantic relationships and her defiant attitude against this reputation are recurring themes on the first tracks. Opener "...Ready for It?" has lyrics about falling in love with a new partner. Inspired by the novel Crime and Punishment by Fyodor Dostoevsky, it incorporates a criminal metaphor that recurs on other tracks; Swift said its mentions of bank heists, robbers, and thieves, a "twisted" but "interesting" way to depict "finding your partner in crime". In "End Game", Swift, Future, and Sheeran rap and sing about finding true love in spite of the gossip surrounding their perceived images. "I Did Something Bad" is narrated from a female character who manipulate men and "Don't Blame Me" compares a love that "makes [her] crazy" to a drug addiction. Designated by Swift as Reputation's "first point of vulnerability", "Delicate" is where the narrator begins to worry if her tarnished reputation could affect a new romance. In the song, she wonders because "[her] reputation has never been worse", the love interest must love her for herself. The album continues with "Look What You Made Me Do", which Swift initially wrote as a poem about her realizing she "couldn't trust certain people". She indicated the most important lyrics of the song as, "Oh, I'm sorry, the old Taylor can't come to the phone right now. Why? Oh, 'cause she's dead", which reference the phone recording between her and West that Kardashian had released.

In "So It Goes...", which features sexual imagery of smeared lipstick on her lover's face and leaving scratches on his back, the narrator details how he helps her get out of her fixations and promises she will "do bad things with [him]" despite not being a "bad girl". "Gorgeous" has playful lyrics about newfound romantic attraction, where the narrator feels tempted to cheat on an existing boyfriend for another. It is followed by "Getaway Car", which uses crime scene escape imagery and a Bonnie and Clyde reference to tell the story of how the narrator leaves her former lover in a hotel room and escapes in the getaway car with a new lover. "King of My Heart" is a straightforward love song in which the narrator proclaims herself as her lover's "American queen" and how the couple rules their "kingdom inside [her] room". Swift structured the song such that each of the sections (verse, pre-chorus, chorus) depicts a separate phase of a relationship, and they altogether form a complete love story. The next track, "Dancing With Our Hands Tied", describes a narrator's reflection on a past relationship when she was 25 years old and how the lover turns her bed "into a sacred oasis".

In "Dress", which features overtly sexual lyrics, the narrator claims that she "only bought this dress" to be taken off by her lover and how she does not "want [him] like a best friend". "This Is Why We Can't Have Nice Things" was inspired by Swift's observation of how people take things for granted. It references her infamous 4th of July parties, filled with champagne and having her "feeling so Gatsby for that whole year". In the track, the narrator calls out her enemies and former friends. When she tries to get diplomatic with them ("forgiveness is a nice thing to do"), she laughs at the idea. The two closing tracks, "Call It What You Want" and "New Year's Day", summarize Swift's state of mind after she learned how to welcome and prioritize certain things in her life. In "Call It What You Want", the narrator accepts that her reputation might be unredeemable ("They took the crown but it's alright") and meditates on the transformative power of her relationship ("My baby's fly like a jetstream, high above the whole scene"). The closing track, "New Year's Day", sees the narrator and her lover cleaning up after a New Year's party. On the inspiration, Swift explained that although kissing someone on New Year's Eve is a romantic idea, having someone by one's side the morning after "to give you Advil and clean up the house" is even more so.

Release

Marketing 
On August 18, 2017, Swift blanked out all of her social media accounts, creating a "social media blackout" and prompting media speculation on new music. In the following days, she uploaded silent, black-and-white short videos of CGI snakes onto social media, which attracted widespread press attention. Imagery of snakes was inspired by the online commotion after the West–Kardashian controversy and dominated the album's promotional campaign. On August 23, she announced on her Instagram that her sixth studio album was titled Reputation and released the cover artwork. Photographed by Mert and Marcus, the cover is a black-and-white photograph of an expressionless Swift in slicked-back hair, a loose-fitting grey sweatshirt with a zig-zag stitch on the right shoulder, and a choker necklace. Her name is printed multiple times over one side of her face, in a typeface resembling that used in newspapers. Media outlets interpreted the design as a mockery at the media scrutiny. The cover inspired many internet memes and was listed among the worst album covers of 2017 by Billboard and Exclaim!, with the latter dismissing it as a "packaging for a sickly sweet, heavily discounted celebrity fragrance you'd find on the back shelf at Shoppers Drug Mart".

Reputation's lead single, "Look What You Made Me Do", was released on August 24. The single opened at number one on the Billboard Hot 100 with the biggest single-week sales and streaming figures of 2017 in the US and was Swift's first number one on the UK Singles Chart; its music video broke the record for the most 24-hour views on YouTube. Shortly after the single's release, UPS announced a partnership with Swift, which included Reputation-branded trucks and award-winning contests promoting the album across US cities. Other corporate tie-ins were a Ticketmaster partnership for a concert tour; an AT&T deal for a behind-the-scenes series chronicling the making of Reputation; and a Target partnership for two deluxe album editions, each featuring an exclusive magazine with poetry, paintings, handwritten lyrics, and behind-the-scenes photography. Swift collaborated with ESPN to preview the second single, "...Ready for It?", during a college football match on September 2; it opened at number four on the Billboard Hot 100. Kate Knibbs of The Ringer labelled the partnerships as "maximum commercialization" and wrote, "If [Swift] was going to be a snake, she was going to be an ultracapitalist snake."

Prior to the album's release, the tracks "Gorgeous" and "Call It What You Want" were released for download and streaming as promotional singles, and the track "New Year's Day" premiered during the broadcast of an episode of ABC's Scandal. Reputation was released in various territories on digital and physical formats on November 10, 2017, by Big Machine Records. The album was kept off streaming platforms until December 1. Throughout late 2017 and early 2018, a string of singles were released to support the album: "End Game" was released to French radio by Mercury Records on November 14, "New Year's Day" impacted US country radio on November 27, and "Delicate" was released to US pop radio on March 12. The last of which was the album's most successful radio single, peaking atop three Billboard airplay charts: Pop Songs, Adult Pop Songs, and Adult Contemporary.

Performances 

Although Swift had actively promoted albums with extensive press interviews and television appearances, she opted out of such a campaign for Reputation. She instead held exclusive secret album-listening sessions within one month in advance for fans selected from social media by herself, hosting them at her homes in Rhode Island, Los Angeles, London, and Nashville. The secret sessions were reserved for 500 fans in total; behind-the-scenes footage was released on Good Morning America on November 7, 2017. She appeared on the cover for British Vogue, for which she appointed her own photographers and published a self-written poem instead of giving an interview. In an interview with Zane Lowe for Apple Music in May 2019, Swift said she turned down interviews because she felt no need to explain the album, and only wanted to convey her feelings regarding the controversies through music. On the title's all lowercase styling, she said it was because the album "wasn't unapologetically commercial"—that it "took the most amount of explanation, and yet it's the one [she] didn't talk about".

Within Reputation's first release week, Swift performed on Saturday Night Live ("...Ready for It?", "Call It What You Want") and Late Night with Jimmy Fallon ("New Year's Day"). She embarked on the Reputation Stadium Tour, which kicked off on May 8, 2018, in Glendale, Arizona and featured supporting acts such as Charli XCX and Camila Cabello. The tour's visual and stage settings incorporated prominent snakes imagery. It encompassed 53 shows across four continents and wrapped up on November 21, 2018, in Tokyo, Japan. The track "Getaway Car" was released as an Australasia-exclusive single to support the Oceanic leg of the Reputation tour in October and November. On completion of its 38-show North American leg, with $266.1 million grosed, it surpassed the Rolling Stones' 70-show US leg of their A Bigger Bang Tour ($245 million; 2005–2007) to become the all-time highest-grossing North American tour. In total, the Reputation Stadium Tour grossed $345.7 million, according to Billboard Boxscore. The show recorded at AT&T Stadium in Arlington, Texas, was released as a Netflix exclusive on December 31, 2018.

Commercial performance 
Reputation sold two million copies worldwide within one week of release. In the US, the album sold roughly 700,000 copies after one day of availability, and 1.05 million after four days. It opened at number one on the US Billboard 200 with first-week figures of 1,238,000 album-equivalent units that consisted of 1,216,000 pure sales—more than any other albums on the chart that week combined. With the achievement, Reputation made Swift the first artist to have four albums each sell more than a million copies within one week since Nielsen SoundScan began tracking sales in 1991. The album spent four non-consecutive weeks at number one, was 2017's best-selling album in the US, and topped the 2018 Billboard 200 Year-End chart. The Recording Industry Association of America (RIAA) in December 2017 certified the album 3× Platinum for surpassing three million album-equivalent units. By October 2022, Reputation's US sales stood at 2.4 million.

Reputation topped the albums charts in many European territories including Austria, the Netherlands, Norway, Portugal, Slovakia, Spain, and Switzerland. The album was certified platinum in Austria, Belgium, Denmark, and Sweden. In the wider English-speaking world, it topped the albums charts of Australia, New Zealand, the UK, Ireland, and Canada. The record was certified platinum or higher in the first three countries, being certified 3× Platinum in both Australia and New Zealand. In Asia-Pacific, Reputation was certified platinum in Singapore and gold in Japan. It sold over one million units in China as of August 2019, becoming one of the best-selling digital albums there. According to the International Federation of the Phonographic Industry (IFPI), Reputation was the world's second-best-selling album of 2017, with 4.5 million copies sold.

Critical reception 

Upon its release, Reputation received generally positive reviews from music critics. At Metacritic, which assigns a normalized rating out of 100 to reviews from mainstream publications, the album received a weighted average score of 71 based on 28 reviews.

Many critics praised Swift's personal lyricism and songwriting depicting vulnerability and intimacy despite the first impressions of a vindictive record. Reviews by McCormick, Cinquemani, and Sheffield appreciated Reputation for exploring vulnerable sentiments beneath the surface of fame and celebrity. Petridis found the celebrity-inspired, dramatic themes tiring, but lauded the album as "a masterclass in pop songwriting" about love and romance. The Independent critic Roisin O'Connor and Vulture journalist Craig Jenkins both regarded Reputation as a showcase of Swift's both vindictive and vulnerable sides; the former lauded it for displaying Swift's talents capturing emotional details "that you as a listener cannot". In The A.V. Club, Clayton Purdom appreciated how, despite Swift's embrace of modern styles, her lyrical narrative retains its distinctive romantic nature since her 2008 single, "Love Story".

The production received mixed reviews. In an outright negative review, Geoff Nelson of Consequence gave the album a D+ rating and called it a "bloated, moving disaster". For Nelson, the album found Swift adopting black-music styles and African-American Vernacular English, a "reflection of a wider cultural problem". Some reviewers agreed that Reputation's black-music influences were controversial and a probable case of cultural appropriation, but Caramanica welcomed them as a sign of Swift embracing modern pop-music trends.

Slant Magazine's Sal Cinquemani called it a good pop album but found it blemished at times by "tired, repetitive EDM tricks", and Pitchfork's Jamieson Cox lamented how Swift's lyrical craftsmanship was overshadowed by what he deemed a conventional and unoriginal production. The Boston Globe's Terrence Cawley and Billboard's Jason Lipshutz identified some stylistics missteps but said the experiments were worthwhile and made an enjoyable listen. The Associated Press's Meskin Fekadu and Variety's Chris Willman hailed Reputation as an outstanding pop album; the latter lauded the balance between Swift's singer-songwriter lyrical strengths and the "up-to-the-second rhythmic pop" of mainstream music.

Accolades 
Reputation featured on several publications' lists of the best albums of 2017, ranking on such lists by Time (fifth), Rolling Stone (seventh), Slant Magazine (17th), The Independent (19), Complex (26th), NME (31st), and Spin (48th). On the mass critics' poll Pazz & Jop coordinated by The Village Voice, the album ranked at number 71 out of the 100 albums voted as the best of 2017. On individual critics' lists, it appeared on those by Sheffield (second), Caramanica (fifth), and Mikael Wood of the Los Angeles Times (unranked). On Slant Magazine's list of the best 2010s-decade album published in 2019, Reputation ranked at number 88.

At industry awards held in 2018, the album won an American Music Award for Favorite Pop/Rock Album, a Billboard Music Award for Top Selling Album, a Libera Award for Independent Impact Album, and a Japan Gold Disc Award for Best 3 Albums (Western). It received nominations including an ARIA Music Award nomination for Best International Artist, a Billboard Music Award nomination for Top Billboard 200 Album, and a Juno Award nomination for International Album of the Year. At the 61st Annual Grammy Awards held in 2019, Reputation was nominated for Best Pop Vocal Album. The album's packaging and design won two awards from the American Advertising Federation.

Legacy 
Released amidst negative press and media scrutiny on Swift, Reputation was regarded by several journalists as her "comeback". Some critics interpreted the release during the chaotic Donald Trump presidency as a political statement—whereas many part of the entertainment industry voiced their opposition to Trump's controversial policies, Swift's "silence" during the 2016 presidential election was highlighted in the press as a shocking phenomenon. Detractors denounced her as aloof and tone-deaf to contemporary political landscape, with The Guardian dubbing her as an envoy for Trump's values. Her inclusion as one of the "Silence Breakers"—a group of six women who publicly spoke out against sexual misconduct—for the cover of Time 2017's People of the Year was criticized by some who disdained her "spineless feminism and political passivity". Some others regarded Reputation as Swift's first commercial disappointment, partly because of its diminished success next to its predecessor, 1989. In defense of Swift, academic and journalist Jane Martinson said that Swift's disengagement from the press represented her efforts to control the narrative and was an empowering move for young women.

Retrospectively, music critics have opined that Reputation surpassed the initial disappointment and stood the test of time; Billboard journalist Andrew Unterberger in August 2019 wrote; "With a couple years' clarity, removed from all the backlash against Swift for her perceived insincerity (and political neutrality), we can now look back on Reputation for what it actually was: a very good pop album that was very successful." Mary Siroky of Consequence observed how time proved it to be an authentic record, contrary to some initial reviews claiming otherwise and, as part of a 2022 piece titled "What Were We Thinking? 15 Times We Were Wrong", opined that the publication's initial review was influenced by Swift's negative press at that time and that its score should have been higher. Joe Lynch of Billboard attributed the initial criticism to the general preconception disregarding lyrics in synthesizer-based arrangements; "Which is a shame, because on Reputation, Swift's words deliver vivid Polaroid shots directly to your brain." Rolling Stone's Kara Voght said the album was Swift's first to "truly be in conversation with its pop contemporaries" and identified some of its songs as her artistic heights. For some critics, though Reputation is not as accomplished as Swift's other albums, its hip-hop experimentation and detail-heavy songwriting led to her refined craftsmanship on subsequent records, namely Folklore (2020), Evermore (2020), and Midnights (2022).

Other opinions observed how the public backlash during promotion of Reputation contributed to Swift's political engagements after 2018; she publicly endorsed political candidates, supported LGBT rights, and criticized systemic racism. The promotional campaign of Reputation, specifically Swift's use of social media, was subject of an academic paper analyzing popular music marketing by media and communications scholars Linda Ryan Bengtsson and Jessica Edlom. The two argued that Reputation was the "most adequate" release in terms of marketing, driven by fan-oriented social media promotion and Swift's long-standing relationship with her supporters. Her "social media blackout" set a precedent for other pop stars to emulate. Commenting on the album rollout cycle, music scholar Jadey O'Regan remarked how Swift used "the art of pop in the best way" for utilizing "the way she's been stereotyped in popular culture". Film director Jennifer Kaytin Robinson cited Reputation as an inspiration for her 2022 teen comedy film Do Revenge.

Track listing 
Credits are adapted from the album liner notes.

Notes 
  signifies an additional vocal producer.
 "Look What You Made Me Do" contains an interpolation of the 1991 song "I'm Too Sexy" by the band Right Said Fred.

Personnel 
Credits are adapted from the album liner notes.

 Taylor Swift – vocals, backing vocals , producer ; executive producer; packaging creative design, package direction, creative packaging direction
 Max Martin – producer, keyboards, programming ; recording ; piano ; backing vocals 
 Shellback – producer, keyboards, programming ; drums ; bass ; guitars 
 Ali Payami – producer, keyboards, programming 
 Jack Antonoff – producer, programming, instruments ; backing vocals ; piano, bass, guitar, synths 
 Oscar Görres – producer, keyboards, programming, piano 
 Oscar Holter – producer, keyboards, programming 
 Michael Ilbert – engineer 
 Sam Holland – engineer 
 Laura Sisk – engineer 
 Noah Passovoy – engineer 
 Cory Bice – assistant engineer 
 Jeremy Lertola – assistant engineer 
 Jon Sher – assistant engineer 
 Ed Sheeran – featured artist 
 Future – featured artist 
 Ilya Salmanzadeh – additional vocal production 
 Seth Ferkins – engineer 
 Sean Flora – assistant engineer 
 Peter Karlsson – assistant engineer 
 Mike  – assistant engineer 
 Daniel Watson – assistant engineer 
 Victoria Parker – violins ; viola 
 Phillip A. Peterson – cellos 
 Evan Smith – saxophones 
 James Reynolds – baby voice intro 
 Sean Hutchinson – drums 
 Serban Ghenea – mixing
 John Hanes – mix engineer
 Randy Merrill – mastering
 Mert and Marcus – photography
 Mat Maitland – photo creative direction
 Joseph Cassell – wardrobe stylist
 Isamaya French – makeup
 Lorraine Griffin – manicurist
 Paul Hanlon – hair
 Josh and Bethany Newman – packaging art direction
 Ben Fieker – packaging design
 Parker Foote – packaging design
 Austin Hale – packaging design

Charts

Weekly charts

Monthly charts

Year-end charts

Decade-end charts

Certifications

Release history

See also 
 List of Billboard 200 number-one albums of 2017
 List of Billboard 200 number-one albums of 2018
 List of number-one albums of 2017 (Australia)
 List of number-one albums of 2017 (Belgium)
 List of number-one albums of 2017 (Canada)
 List of number-one albums of 2017 (Ireland)
 List of number-one albums of 2018 (Ireland)
 List of number-one albums from the 2010s (New Zealand)
 
 List of top 25 albums for 2017 in Australia
 List of top 25 albums for 2018 in Australia
 Lists of fastest-selling albums
 List of best-selling albums in China
 List of best-selling albums by year in the United States
 List of best-selling albums in the United States of the Nielsen SoundScan era

References

Cited literature

External links 
 Reputation on Swift's official website
 

2017 albums
Taylor Swift albums
Big Machine Records albums
Albums produced by Taylor Swift
Albums produced by Jack Antonoff
Albums produced by Max Martin
Albums produced by Shellback (record producer)
Electropop albums
Contemporary R&B albums by American artists
Albums produced by Ali Payami
Albums produced by Oscar Görres
Albums produced by Oscar Holter